Bethuel Peck (June 16, 1788 – July 11, 1862) was an American physician and politician from New York.

Life
He was the son of Daniel Peck (1754–1840) and Mehitable (Harvey) Peck (d. 1826), and was born in an area which in 1812 became part of the Town of Sand Lake, in Rensselaer County, New York. He married Jerusha Wiston, and their only daughter died in infancy.

He practiced medicine in Glens Falls, New York, and ran a drugstore there with Billy J. Clark.

He was a member of the New York State Senate (4th D.) from 1839 to 1842, sitting in the 62nd, 63rd, 64th and 65th New York State Legislatures.

He was President of the Dividend Mutual Insurance Company, of Glens Falls.

Sources
The New York Civil List compiled by Franklin Benjamin Hough (pages 132f and 144; Weed, Parsons and Co., 1858)
A Genealogical History of the Descendants of Joseph Peck by Ira B. Peck (Boston, 1868; pg. 46, 56 and 82)
History of Warren County by H. P. Smith, transcription at RootsWeb

1788 births
1862 deaths
New York (state) state senators
People from Sand Lake, New York
Politicians from Glens Falls, New York
New York (state) Whigs
19th-century American politicians
Physicians from New York (state)